The discography of Franz Ferdinand, a Scottish indie rock band, consists of five studio albums, one remix album, two compilation albums, two live albums, one video album, six extended plays, 26 singles, four promotional singles and 31 music videos.

The band first experienced major chart success with their second single, "Take Me Out", which peaked at number three on the UK Singles Chart. The release of the single was followed by their debut album, Franz Ferdinand, which debuted at number three on the UK Albums Chart. The band went on to win the 2004 Mercury Music Prize and two BRIT Awards in 2005 for Best British Group and Best British Rock Act. NME named Franz Ferdinand as their Album of the Year for 2004.

Additionally, Franz Ferdinand recorded and released one album as FFS (an abbreviation of Franz Ferdinand and Sparks), a collaborative supergroup with American art rock band Sparks, in 2015.

Albums

Studio albums

Remix albums

Compilation albums

Notes

Live albums

Video releases

Notes

Extended plays

Notes

Singles

Notes

Promotional singles

Notes

Guest appearances

Music videos

Notes

References

External links

 Official website
 
 
 

Discography
Discographies of British artists
Rock music group discographies